The hawthorn-carrot aphid, (Dysaphis crataegi), also known as Dysaphis (Dysaphis) crataegi, is an aphid in the superfamily Aphidoidea in the order Hemiptera. It is a true bug and sucks sap from plants.

Taxonomy
The hawthorn-carrot aphid was first described by the German entomologist Johann Heinrich Kaltenbach in 1843. It has three subspecies in Europe. All overwinter on their primary host, hawthorn trees (Crataegus) spp., but each migrates to a different secondary host in the family Apiaceae during the summer; D. c. crataegi moves to wild carrot (Daucus carota), D. c. kunzei to wild parsnip (Pastinaca sativa) and D. c. aethusae to hedge parsley (Torilis spp.) or fool's parsley (Aethusa cynapium). Two further subspecies are found to Asia.

Description
On the secondary host, wingless viviparous females are greenish-grey or yellowish-grey, again dusted with fine wax particles. Winged viviparous females are greyish-red with black markings. Egg-laying females are reddish-brown and winged males are reddish with black markings.

Ecology
The hawthorn-carrot aphid migrates to its primary host in late summer and forms red, curling  galls on its leaves. The following spring, females move to its secondary host, an umbellifer in the family Apiaceae, and produce live offspring, When these nymphs are sufficiently mature, they produce further live young. Most offspring are wingless, but some winged females are produced which are able to colonize new secondary hosts. In late summer winged females and males are produced and migrate to hawthorn trees. These aphids are attended by ants on both their primary and secondary hosts.

References

External links

Macrosiphini
Agricultural pest insects
Gall-inducing insects
Insects described in 1843